William Henry Dillon Bell (1 March 1884 – 31 July 1917) was a Reform Party Member of Parliament in New Zealand.

He won the Wellington Suburbs and Country seat in the 1911 general election, and held it to 1914, when he retired and volunteered for service in World War I. He served in the Samoa Expeditionary Force, and was killed in action in Belgium on 31 July 1917 as a Captain with a King's regiment, the 1st King Edward's Horse.

He was a son of Sir Francis Bell, a Reform Party leader and later the first New Zealand-born Prime Minister.

References

External links
Military personnel file at Archives (downloadable)

Reform Party (New Zealand) MPs
New Zealand MPs for Wellington electorates
New Zealand military personnel of World War I
New Zealand military personnel killed in World War I
New Zealand Army officers
Members of the New Zealand House of Representatives
Children of prime ministers of New Zealand
1884 births
1917 deaths
New Zealand people of Jewish descent
William Henry